Kevin Kelley (born June 25, 1969) is an American football coach who formerly served as the head coach at Presbyterian College. Prior to his hiring at Presbyterian, Kelley was most recently the head football coach and athletic director at Pulaski Academy in Little Rock, Arkansas, where he won nine AAA state championships and employed a unique strategy that involved rarely punting and almost always attempting onside kicks and two-point conversions.

Early life and education
Originally a native of Hot Springs, Arkansas, Kelley attended Glenwood High School in Glenwood, Arkansas, which has since consolidated with a nearby school to become Centerpoint High School. Kelley then attended Henderson State University in Arkadelphia, Arkansas, graduating with a Bachelor of Science degree in 1992. He was the first member of his family to graduate from college.

Coaching career

Carrollton ISD
Kelley began his coaching career at the Carrollton-Farmers Branch Independent School District in Carrollton, Texas. From 1993 to 1997, in addition to teaching earth science, he served as the head coach of one of the district's 7th-grade teams while also serving as a scout for one of the senior high teams.

Pulaski Academy
Kelley arrived at Pulaski Academy in Little Rock, Arkansas in 1997, and he served as their offensive coordinator until 2002. He was promoted to head coach in time for the 2003 season.

From 2003 to 2020, Kelley served as the head football coach at Pulaski Academy. He has gained notoriety for his unique numbers-based coaching strategy, which involves rarely punting and almost always attempting fourth down conversions ("going for it"), onside kicks (unless his team is leading by 21 points or more), and two-point conversions. Kelley's teams were consistently competitive; the Bruins won nine Arkansas Activities Association state championships under his direction, were named to the list of the top ten Arkansas football dynasties, at No. 5, by MaxPreps in 2011, and as the No. 1 most dominant Arkansas high school football program of the decade in 2020. Additionally, Kelley's offenses own each of the top 12 highest single-season yardage totals in Arkansas high school history.

Pulaski won their first title under Kelley in 2003, in his first season at the helm of the program, and subsequently won titles in 2008, 2011, 2014, 2015, 2016, 2017, 2019, and 2020; Pulaski's four consecutive titles from 2014 to 2017 made them only the fourth team in Arkansas high school history to do so, and the first since Barton High School from 1986 to 1989. Prior to the start of the 2020 season, Kelley was listed as having the 15th-highest all-time winning percentage among high school football coaches.

Kelley was named the USA Today High School Coach of the Year in 2016 and was inducted into the Arkansas Sports Hall of Fame in April 2021. Bill Belichick said of Kelley in December 2020 that he was "...probably the top high school coach in the country," and mentioned that he "[had] great respect for coach Kelley". Kelley's strategy has been the subject of reports by The New York Times, Sports Illustrated, The Wall Street Journal, and Time, and was included in a chapter of Scorecasting, a book by Toby Moskowitz and L. Jon Wertheim.

In an interview shortly after he was hired by Presbyterian, Kelley told Pete Thamel of Yahoo Sports that he was most proud of his offensive acumen, and noted that his play-calling style was as heavily data-driven as his more publicized special teams idiosyncrasies. Kelley considers his offensive philosophy "intermediate", which he defines as geared heavily toward midrange passes in front of the safeties, with a high percentage of pass plays designed to generate yards after the catch. According to Thamel,

Presbyterian
Following the conclusion of the 2020 season, there were some ideas that led to speculation that Kelley could be considered for a Division I job, namely the head coaching position at Kansas, a job Kelley supposedly said he would accept for $90,000 per win. Ultimately, Kelley was hired as the 16th head football coach at Presbyterian College on May 6, 2021. He took over the Blue Hose program for their first full season in the Pioneer Football League after a shortened 2021 spring season under Tommy Spangler.

Kelley communicated his decision in an email to Pulaski Academy parents on May 6, and the college officially announced the hire on May 7, 2021.

In Kelley's debut as Presbyterian head coach on September 4, 2021, the Blue Hose broke two significant passing records in their 84–43 win over NAIA member St. Andrews. Ren Hefley threw for 10 touchdowns, breaking the previous FCS record of 9 first set in 1984 by Willie Totten of Mississippi Valley State and equaled in 2007 by Drew Hubel of Portland State. With backup quarterback Tyler Huff adding 2 TD passes, the Blue Hose set a new Division I team record (for both FCS and FBS) of 12, breaking the previous record of 11 set in 1990 by Houston quarterback David Klingler.

On December 4, 2021, Presbyterian College announced that Kelley had stepped down as head coach due to personal reasons. He amassed a 2-9 record in his only year at Presbyterian.

Personal life
Kelley and his wife, Dana, have two children.

Head coaching record

High school

College

References

External links
 Presbyterian profile

1969 births
Living people
Presbyterian Blue Hose football coaches
High school football coaches in Arkansas
High school football coaches in Texas
Henderson State University alumni
Sportspeople from Hot Springs, Arkansas
Coaches of American football from Arkansas